Dana Evans (born August 1, 1998) is an American professional basketball player for the Chicago Sky of the Women's National Basketball Association. A two-time ACC Basketball Player of the Year at the University of Louisville, she was drafted with the 13th overall pick of the 2021 WNBA Draft.

Early life  
Evans grew up in Gary, Indiana, where although she did not play basketball until the fourth grade, she immediately excelled at it. She was praised for her skills on defense, and was said to have garnered an offer to play college basketball by Valparaiso head coach Keith Freeman in the sixth grade. The first girl from Gary to make it to the McDonald's All-American Game, Evans averaged over 35 points per game in her senior season, also winning three Class 4A sectional titles for West Side Leadership Academy.

College career 
One of the top recruits in college basketball, Evans committed to playing at Louisville, where she was named to the ACC All-Freshman team in 2018. In her sophomore year she was named the ACC sixth player of the year after averaging over 10 points per game off the bench.

Evans was named the ACC Player of the Year in 2020, the first player in ACC history to go from winning sixth player of the year to player of the year. She was also named the conference player of the year in 2021, the fourth consecutive season a player from the Louisville program was named the conference's top player.

Professional career 
Evans was drafted by the Dallas Wings with the 13th overall pick of the 2021 WNBA Draft. Evans was traded to the Chicago Sky on June 2, 2021.

College statistics 

|-
| style="text-align:center;" | 2017–18
| Louisville
| 39
| 1 
| 21.0
| .364
| .224
| .797
| 2.0
| 3.4
| 0.1
| 1.1
| 1.8
| 5.1
|-
| style="text-align:center;" | 2018–19
| Louisville
| 36
| 5
| 25.9
| .418
| .385
| .842
| 2.4
| 4.0
| 0.0
| 1.5
| 1.8
| 10.4
|-
| style="text-align:center;" | 2019–20
| Louisville
| 30
| 29
| 33.7
| .416
| .431
| .890
| 2.8
| 4.2
| 0.0
| 0.8
| 2.5
| 18.0
|-
| style="text-align:center;" | 2020–21
| Louisville
| 30
| 30
| 32.9
| .430
| .353
| .873
| 2.7
| 3.9
| 0.1
| 1.3
| 2.1
| 20.1
|-
| style="text-align:center;" colspan=2 |  Career
| 135
| 65
| 27.8
| .414
| .377
| .858
| 2.4
| 3.9
| 0.0
| 1.2
| 2.0
| 12.7

WNBA career statistics

Regular Season

|-
| style="text-align:left;"| 2021*
| style="text-align:left;"| Dallas
| 6 || 0 || 4.0 || .342 || .400 || 1.000 || 0.4 || 1.0 || 0.0 || 0.0 || 0.7 || 0.8
|- 
| style="text-align:left;background:#afe6ba;"| 2021†*
| style="text-align:left;"|  Chicago
| 23 || 0 || 8.6 || .356 || .405 || .885 || 0.5 || 1.2 || 0.2 || 0.0 || 0.6 || 3.9
|-
| style="text-align:left;"| 2022
| style="text-align:left;"| Chicago
| 33 || 1 || 11.5 || .377 || .328 || .880 || 0.8 || 1.2 || 0.3 || 0.1 || 0.8 || 4.3
|- 
| style="text-align:left;"| Career
| style="text-align:left;"| 2 year, 2 teams
| 62 || 1 || 9.7 || .364 || .357 || .882 || 0.6 || 1.1 || 0.2 || 0.1 || 0.7 || 3.8

Postseason

|- 
| style="text-align:left;background:#afe6ba;"|  2021†
| style="text-align:left;"|  Chicago
| 9 || 0 || 7.1 || .313 || .417 || .000 || 0.6 || 0.2 || 0.2 || 0.0 || 0.7 || 1.7
|-
| style="text-align:left;"| 2022
| style="text-align:left;"| Chicago
| 4 || 0 || 5.8 || .600 || .600 || 1.000 || 0.8 || 0.5 || 0.5 || 0.0 || 0.3 || 4.3
|- 
| style="text-align:left;"| Career
| style="text-align:left;"| 2 year, 1 team
| 13 || 0 || 6.7 || .423 || .471 || 1.000 || 0.6 || 0.3 || 0.3 || 0.0 || 0.5 || 2.5

References

External links 
 Louisville Cardinals bio

1998 births
Living people
All-American college women's basketball players
American women's basketball players
Basketball players from Gary, Indiana
Chicago Sky players
Dallas Wings draft picks
Dallas Wings players
Louisville Cardinals women's basketball players
McDonald's High School All-Americans
Shooting guards